Ricciotto Canudo (2 January 1877, Gioia del Colle – 10 November 1923, Paris) was an early Italian film theoretician who lived primarily in France. In 1913 he published a bimonthly avant-garde magazine entitled Montjoie!, promoting Cubism in particular. He saw cinema as "plastic art in motion", and gave cinema the label "the Sixth Art", later changed to "the Seventh Art", still current in French, Italian, and Spanish conceptions of art, among others. Canudo subsequently added dance as a precursor to the sixth—a third rhythmic art with music and poetry—making cinema the seventh art.

Work
In his manifesto The Birth of the Sixth Art, published in 1911, Canudo argued that cinema was a new art, "a superb conciliation of the Rhythms of Space (the Plastic Arts) and the Rhythms of Time (Music and Poetry)", a synthesis of the five ancient arts: architecture, sculpture, painting, music, and poetry (cf. Hegel's Lectures on Aesthetics).

Canudo later added dance as a sixth precursor, a third rhythmic art with music and poetry, making cinema the seventh art.

Montjoie!
Between 1913 and 1914, he published a bimonthly avant-garde magazine entitled Montjoie!, organe de l'impérialisme artistique Francais. Participating artists included Guillaume Apollinaire, Maurice Raynal, Albert Gleizes and Joseph Csaky. The magazine paid special attention to poetry, prose, articles on art, literature, music and history. The contributors included André Salmon, Igor Stravinsky, Erik Satie, Fernand Léger, Guillaume Apollinaire, Blaise Cendrars, Alfredo Casella, Raoul Dufy, Stefan Zweig, Robert Delaunay, Max Jacob, and Emile Verhaeren.

The first issue was published on 10 February 1913. The second included an essay signed by Igor Stravinsky presenting his new ballet The Rite of Spring as a religious work of faith grounded in a pagan, pantheistic conception. A special issue in the second volume of Montjoie!, published on 18 March 1914, was devoted entirely to the 30th Salon des Indépendants. The article written by André Salmon included photographs of works by Joseph Csaky, Robert Delaunay, Marc Chagall, Alice Bailly, Jacques Villon, Sonia Delaunay, André Lhote, Roger de La Fresnaye, Moise Kisling, Ossip Zadkine, Lucien Laforge and Valentine de Saint-Point. Publication of the magazine stopped in June 1914, on the eve of the First World War.

In 1920, he established an avant-garde magazine Le Gazette de sept arts, and a film club, CASA (Club des amis du septième art), in 1921. His best-known essay "Reflections on the Seventh Art" ("Réflexions sur le septième art") was published in 1923 after a number of earlier drafts, all published in Italy or France.

Other writings
 La ville sans chef, Paris 1910
 Music as a religion of the future, London 1913
 L'usine aux images, Paris 1926. (A collection of his essays)

Notes

References
 French Film Theory and Criticism: A History/Anthology, 1907–1939 by Richard Abel (Editor), Princeton University Press, (1993) 
 The Birth of the Sixth Art pp. 58–66
 Reflections on the Seventh Art pp. 291–303
 The Visual Turn by Angela Dalle Vacche (Editor), Rutgers University Press, (2002),

External links
 Montjoie!, Special edition for the Salon des Artistes Indépendants, 18 March 1913
 Montjoie!, January-February 1914, N. 1 - N. 2
 Montjoie!, March 1914, N. 3
 Montjoie!, April, May, June, 1914, N.4, N. 5, N. 6
 Text on Manifeste des sept arts, Université de Metz
 Biography of Ricciotto Canudo by l'Amicale des Anciens de la Légion Etrangère de Paris

Film theorists
1879 births
1923 deaths
Italian film critics
20th-century male writers
20th-century French poets
20th-century French novelists
20th-century French musicologists
French art critics
French screenwriters
French film critics
Chevaliers of the Légion d'honneur
Recipients of the Croix de Guerre 1914–1918 (France)
20th-century French screenwriters
19th-century musicologists